Big Sister, Little Brother is an animated series that first aired on SVT in Sweden in 1997. It is based on a series of children's books by Anders Jacobsson and Sören Olsson.

Plot summary

This show is about a young girl and her little brother playing and exploring the world around them.

International telecast
In the United States, it was first shown on the Captain Kangaroo spin-off Mr. Moose's Fun Time on Fox Family Channel on August 17, 1998. From 2005 to 2009, it reran on PBS Kids Sprout (now Universal Kids).

Characters
Big Sister
Little Brother
Mummy and Daddy
Big Brother

References

External links
Anders och Sören – Storasyster & Lillebror

1997 Swedish television series debuts
1990s animated television series
Animated preschool education television series
1990s preschool education television series
Swedish animated television series
Children's animated television series
Animated television series about children
Animated television series about siblings
Television series by Mattel Creations